Felix Hunger (c.1837 – 11 May 1918) was a New Zealand blacksmith, farmer and coloniser. He was born in Safien Platz, Switzerland on c.1837.

References

1837 births
1918 deaths
New Zealand farmers
New Zealand blacksmiths
Swiss emigrants to New Zealand